Oriel may refer to:

Places

Canada
 Oriel, a community in the municipality of Norwich, Ontario, Canada

Ireland
 Oriel Park, Dundalk, the home ground of Dundalk FC
 Oriel House, Ballincollig, County Cork
 Kingdom of Oriel (Airgíalla in Irish), a medieval kingdom in north-central Ireland
 Uriel (The Norman controlled part of Airgíalla, now represented by County Louth)

United Kingdom
Oriel Street, Oxford
Oriel Square, Oxford

Schools
 Oriel College, Oxford
 Oriel school (disambiguation)

Art galleries
Oriel Gallery, Dublin, Ireland
Oriel Mostyn, Llandudno, Wales, now known as Mostyn
Oriel y Parc, St Davids, Pembrokeshire, Wales, operated by Amgueddfa Cymru – National Museum Wales
Oriel Ynys Môn, Llangefni, Anglesey, Wales

People
 Oriel Gray (1920–2003), Australian dramatist and playwright
 Oriel Malet (1923–2014), pen name of British author Lady Auriel Rosemary Malet Vaughan

Other uses
 Oriel (scripting language), for Microsoft Windows
 Oriel Wind Farm, Irish wind power business
 Oriel window, a type of bay window which projects from a wall
 The Oriel, a former restaurant in Gilford, County Down, Northern Ireland
 Baron Oriel, a title in the Peerage of Ireland
 Oriel, an alternative name for the archangel Uriel

See also
 Oriel Chambers, Liverpool, England
 Oriel Chambers, Kingston upon Hull, England
 Oriel House, Ballincollig, County Cork, Ireland, a hotel
 Oriel House, Westland Row, Dublin, Ireland
 
 Auriol (disambiguation)